Ahmed Shareef, (19 May 1941 – 2007), popularly known as  Pagal Adilabadi, was an Urdu poet from Adilabad, India. He wrote mazahiya shayari or humorous poetry in his native dialect of Hyderabadi Urdu. His pen name, "Pagal", means "crazy" in Urdu.

Early life
Pagal Adilabadi was born 19 May 1941 in Nizamabad district. He was a teacher in a government school in Adilabad, hence the name.

Career
Pagal Adilabadi wrote humorous poems, shayari in Urdu.

The book Khusur Phusr collects his life work. In the initial stage of his life he never published his works. He was busy working as a teacher, but after retiring from his job, he started writing the books.

Ahmed Sherif died at the age of 66 while working on his book Bagare Baingan.

Bibliography
 Khusur Phusr - Goonj publications (Nizamabad).

References

External links
 Video clip of Pagal poetry recital
 Audio clips of Pagal Adilabadi on UrduLife.com
 Audio clips of Pagal Adilabadi on Mushaira.org

Urdu-language poets from India
Indian male poets
People from Nizamabad, Telangana
1941 births
Living people